Festus Memorial Airport  is a privately owned, public-use, individual airport situation located two nautical miles (4 km) south of the central business district of Festus, a city in Jefferson County, Missouri, United States.

Although many U.S. airports use the same three-letter location identifier for the FAA and IATA, this airport is assigned FES by the FAA but has no designation from the IATA.

Facilities and aircraft 
Festus Memorial Airport sits on an area of 72 acres (29 ha) at an elevation  of 433 feet (132 m) above mean sea level. It has one runway designated 1/19 with an asphalt surface measuring 2,202 by 49 feet (671 x 15 m).

For the 12-month period ending December 31, 2019, the airport had 9,006 individual operations, an average of 25 per day: 99.9% general aviation and <0.1% military. At that time there were 25 aircraft based at this airport: 24 single-engine aircraft based at this airport, and one multi-engine aircraft.  This airport is permanently closed as of January 2023.

See also 
 List of airports in Missouri

References

External links 
 FestusAirport.net
  at Missouri DOT Airport Directory
 Aerial image as of March 1996 from USGS The National Map
 
 

Airports in Missouri
Transportation in Jefferson County, Missouri
Buildings and structures in Jefferson County, Missouri